Despina Chatzivassiliou-Tsovilis is the Secretary General of the Parliamentary Assembly of the Council of Europe (PACE), a body which brings together 306 parliamentarians from the national parliaments of the 46 Council of Europe member states. She was elected to the post  in 2021 by the members of the Assembly for a five-year term of office beginning on 1 March 2021, and heads a multinational secretariat of around 80 staff based in Strasbourg, France. She is the first woman to hold the post since the Assembly was created in 1949, and the first person of Greek nationality.

Career 
Dr Chatzivassiliou-Tsovilis worked at PACE for 21 years prior to her election, leading in turn the secretariats of the Assembly’s Monitoring and Political Affairs Committees. She began her career at the Council of Europe in 1993 at the European Commission of Human Rights, and has also worked for the secretariat of its executive body, the Committee of Ministers.

She is a lawyer, and holds a PhD in law from the European University Institute in Florence, Italy, where she also served as a Research Assistant for the Italian jurist Professor Antonio Cassese, the first President of the International Criminal Tribunal for the former Yugoslavia and first President of the Council of Europe’s anti-torture committee. Prior to that, she studied law at the University of Athens. She speaks fluent English, French and Italian, as well as her mother tongue of Greek, and has in the past taught classical guitar.

She was born on 28 February 1967 in Athens (Greece), is married and has two children.

Vision 
In an online letter of motivation published prior to her election, Dr Chatzivassiliou-Tsovilis said her priorities as Secretary General would be reform of the Assembly to enhance its impact across the 46 member states by building on synergies with national parliaments, modernising working methods and making better use of the potential of the Council of Europe as a whole.

She pledged to uphold the Assembly’s crucial role as a forum for dialogue in an increasingly complex and challenging political environment: “I have the conviction that it is only by working together that we can make a difference […] I am a staunch supporter of the values of democracy, the rule of law and human rights which I have sworn to serve.”

Duties of the PACE Secretary General 
In line with the Assembly’s [Rules of Procedure, the Secretary General ensures the fulfilment of its mandate as the parliamentary arm of the Council of Europe, and ensures the proper conduct of parliamentary proceedings. She is the head of a secretariat which assists the Assembly’s members – including its President – to carry out their work, preparing reports, holding meetings and conducting field visits.

Combining political acumen, administrative ability, impartiality, personal integrity and human empathy, the Secretary General ensures the Assembly’s role as a forum for parliamentary dialogue, and a driving force for upholding the Council of Europe’s core values of human rights, democracy and the rule of law.

References

External Links

Main publications of Despina Chatzivassiliou-Tsovilis

1967 births
Living people
European University Institute alumni